South Korea participated in the 2010 Asian Beach Games in Muscat, Oman on 8–16 December 2010.

Korea sent 24 athletes (18 men and 6 women) who competed in 4 sports.

Athletes

Medal summary

Medals table

References

External links 
Official Site
Korea medals page

Nations at the 2010 Asian Beach Games
2010
Asian Beach Games